Marter is an unincorporated community in geographic Marter Township in the Unorganized West part of Timiskaming District in Northeastern Ontario, Canada. Ontario Highway 624 runs through the community, which is named for George Frederick Marter.

References

Other map sources:

Communities in Timiskaming District